The 2001 Penn Quakers football team represented the University of Pennsylvania in the 2001 NCAA Division I-AA football season.

Schedule

Roster

References

Penn
Penn Quakers football seasons
Penn Quakers football